Kapin is an Oceanic language in Morobe Province, Papua New Guinea. It may be part of the Mumeng dialect chain.

References

South Huon Gulf languages
Languages of Morobe Province